Heiki Raudla (born 20 May 1949 in Võhma) is an Estonian educator, cartoonist and politician. 

Rausla graduated from the Department of Physics and Chemistry of Tartu State University in 1972 with a degree in physics. He later worked as a physics teacher. Since 1972, he has been drawing cartoons for newspapers such as Edasi, Tee Kommunismile, Sakala, Oma maa, and magazines such as Pikker and Noorus.

He was a member of VII Riigikogu.

References

Living people
1949 births
Members of the Riigikogu, 1992–1995
Estonian cartoonists
University of Tartu alumni
Recipients of the Order of the White Star, 5th Class
People from Võhma